Paramelomys is a genus of rodent. All of the nine species of the genus are found in West Papua, Indonesia and Papua New Guinea.

Species
Paramelomys gressitti
Paramelomys levipes
Paramelomys lorentzii
Paramelomys mollis
Paramelomys moncktoni
Paramelomys naso
Paramelomys platyops
Paramelomys rubex
Paramelomys steini

References
  1996: A systematic revision of Melomys (Rodentia: Muridae) of New Guinea. Australian Journal of Zoology, 44(4): 367–426. 

 
Rodent genera